Melville College Former Pupils is a former rugby union side in Edinburgh, Scotland.

History

The club was originally known as Edinburgh Institution F.P. However the Edinburgh Institute college, that the rugby union club was based on, moved its premises and was renamed Melville College in 1936.

Similarly the Edinburgh Institution F.P. club was renamed on the move. The Melville College Former Pupils rugby football club thus began in 1936.

Merger

In 1973 the rugby union teams Melville College FP merged with Stewart's College FP when their two constituent colleges also merged.

The new side was named Stewart's Melville RFC.

Notable former players

Edinburgh District

The following former Melville College FP players have represented Edinburgh District at provincial level.

Scotland

The following former Melville College FP players have represented Scotland at full international level.

Honours

Peebles Sevens
 Champions (2): 1940, 1965
 Edinburgh Borderers Sevens
 Champions: 1973

References

Scottish rugby union teams
Rugby clubs established in 1936
1936 establishments in Scotland
Rugby union in Edinburgh
Sports teams in Edinburgh
Defunct Scottish rugby union clubs
Rugby union clubs disestablished in 1973
1973 disestablishments in Scotland